Cassembe is a town in Lunda Sul Province in Angola. The Angolan Armed Forces (FAA) captured the town of Cassembe on June 8, 2001 during the Angolan Civil War, as it was a major UNITA military stronghold.

References

Populated places in Lunda Sul Province